Guidance Software, Inc. was a public company (NASDAQ: GUID) founded in 1997. Headquartered in Pasadena, California, the company developed and provided software solutions for digital investigations primarily in the United States, Europe, the Middle East, Africa, and the Asia/Pacific Rim. Guidance Software had offices in Brazil, Chicago, Houston, New York City, San Francisco, Singapore, United Kingdom and Washington, D.C. and employed approximately 371 employees. On September 14, 2017, the company was acquired by OpenText.

Best known for its EnCase digital investigations software, Guidance Software's product line was organized around four markets: digital forensics, endpoint security analytics, cyber security incident response, and e-discovery. The company served law-enforcement and government agencies, as well as corporations in various industries, such as financial and insurance services, technology, defense contracting, telecom, pharmaceutical, healthcare, manufacturing, and retail. The company operated through four business segments: products, professional services, training and maintenance, and operates two certification programs for the EnCase Certified Examiner (EnCE) and EnCase Certified eDiscovery Practitioner (EnCEP) designations. In May 2010, the company completed the acquisition of Tableau, LLC. In February 2012, Guidance Software acquired CaseCentral.

Notable case mentions

Guidance Software has been noted in a number of high-profile use cases. In 2002, Guidance Software's EnCase was used in the murder trial of David Westerfield to examine his computers and disks to connect him to child pornography. That same year, EnCase was used by French police to uncover emails from now-convicted shoe bomber Richard Colvin Reid.

In 2004, EnCase software was used in the trial of now convicted Scott Peterson for the murder of his wife, Laci Peterson. Computer forensic experts used EnCase to examine Peterson's five computer hard drives, which provided valuable evidence that he had shopped online for a boat, studied water currents, bought a gift for his mistress in the weeks leading up to his wife's death and showed interest in a computer map that included Brooks Island, where his wife was later found.

In 2005, American serial killer Dennis Lynn Rader (also known as the BTK killer) sent a floppy disk to FOX affiliate KSAS-TV in Wichita, Kansas. Using EnCase, police were able to find metadata embedded in a deleted Microsoft Word document that was, unbeknownst to Rader, on the disk. The metadata contained "Christ Lutheran Church", and the document was marked as last modified by "Dennis". A search of the church website turned up Dennis Rader as president of the congregation council. Police began surveillance of Rader.

In 2011, following Sony Online Entertainment's multiple security breaches, Sony said it would be working with Data Forté, Guidance Software and Protiviti to resolve its PlayStation breach. And in May 2011, after the killing of Osama bin Laden, it was reported that an assault team of Navy SEALs removed computers, hard drives, USB sticks and DVDs from bin Laden's compound for forensic analysis. Based on a job description supporting the task, Guidance Software's EnCase is believed to be the tool selected for analysis of the electronic gear. Later that year, Guidance Software's EnCase was noted as a forensic software tool used in the trial of Casey Anthony, following the death of her daughter Caylee Anthony. Investigators used EnCase to search digital cameras and computers. Using the software, Detective Sandra Osborne of Orange County Sheriff's Department, found correctly and incorrectly spelled searches for the word “chloroform.”

Key Management
John Colbert - CEO
Victor Limongelli- CEO
Shawn McCreight - CTO and Founder
Frank Sansone - CFO
Barry Plaga - CFO
Sandy Gyenes - CHRO
Mark Harrington - General Counsel

References

Computer security software companies
Digital forensics software
Software companies based in California
Technology companies based in Greater Los Angeles
Multinational companies headquartered in the United States
Companies based in Pasadena, California
Software companies established in 1997
1997 establishments in California
2017 mergers and acquisitions
Companies formerly listed on the Nasdaq
American subsidiaries of foreign companies
Defunct software companies of the United States